Caleb Crain is an American writer, who was a Lambda Literary Award nominee in the Gay Fiction category at the 26th Lambda Literary Awards in 2014 for his debut novel Necessary Errors.

A graduate of Harvard University and Columbia University, Crain has published book reviews and essays in publications including The New Yorker, The New York Review of Books, The London Review of Books, The Nation, The New York Times Book Review, Out and The New Republic. He also published the non-fiction book American Sympathy: Men, Friendship, and Literature in the New Nation in 2001.

He lives in New York City with his husband, blogger and editor Peter Terzian.

Bibliography

Books

Overthrow (2019) (novel)

Essays and reporting

References

External links
Caleb Crain

Year of birth missing (living people)
Living people
21st-century American novelists
21st-century American essayists
American literary critics
American male essayists
American male novelists
Columbia University alumni
American gay writers
Harvard University alumni
American LGBT novelists
The New Yorker people
21st-century American male writers
21st-century LGBT people